Paul Andrew Francis Dempsey (born 16 March 1960) is a British TV and radio sports presenter and commentator now chiefly employed by BT Sport where he covers football and boxing coverage, as well as TV host and commentary on Indonesian Djarum's multiplatform Mola TV. After 18 years working for Sky Sports and 7 with the Dublin-based channels of Setanta Sports, Dempsey was signed by BT Sport prior to their UK launch.

Early life
Dempsey was born in Marylebone, London and lived in Leicester, England between 1966 and 1978. He attended St Joseph’s School and then City of Leicester Boys' School; it had a notable record of success in football, with England strikers Gary Lineker and Emile Heskey among its products. He then went up to St. John’s College, Cambridge, where he read English Literature between 1979 and 1982. He won two Blues and captained Cambridge in the annual football Varsity match against Oxford. He was one of the first ever recruits to UCD's Sports Scholarship system. He then played football for University College Dublin A.F.C. (UCD) as a defender during the 1982–83 League of Ireland season. He won the Collingwood Cup during his time at Belfield Park.

Radio career
After a summer job opportunity at the Irish News in Belfast he joined BBC as a graduate Trainee in late 1984. After spells in BBC Radio Sport and BBC Radio News he joined the Swiss Broadcasting Corporation, based in Bern, where he worked on radio between May 1986 and October 1987. Returning to London he freelanced at ITN and Channel Four News while launching Capital Radio's sports coverage with Jonathan Pearce.

Television career
At Christmas 1988 Dempsey was invited to audition for the launch of Sky News, which went on air in February 1989. Dempsey was one of the first presenters to be seen on screen and became a regular presenting sports news bulletins, simultaneously establishing himself as one of the lead commentators on Sky's initial sports channel, Eurosport. He covered the 1990 World Cup working alongside Ian Darke and Peter Brackley and the 1992 Barcelona Olympics. After the merger of Sky and British Satellite Broadcasting, Sky Sports became the new dedicated subscription sports channel for the network and Dempsey made his name covering football and boxing alongside other regulars, Richard Keys and Andy Gray as part of a multi-award-winning team. When Sky captured Premier League rights for the first time Dempsey presented Sports Saturday, later Soccer Saturday, with Sue Barker. He co-created the format for the show, which has remained unchanged for over 20 years, with Senior Producer Rik Dovey, a lieutenant of then Sky Sports chief David Hill. From the mid-1990s Sky boosted their boxing coverage by signing up most of the biggest names in Britain and the United States and Dempsey fronted all of the major shows either on regular subscription or Pay Per View Channels. His main analysts were former world champions Barry McGuigan, Jim Watt and Glenn McCrory and former commonwealth champion Nicky Piper.

For a period Sky enjoyed a near monopoly on the sport’s biggest names including Lennox Lewis, Evander Holyfield, Mike Tyson, Nigel Benn, Chris Eubank, Steve Collins and Naseem Hamed. Dempsey also became known to a wider international audience through regular commentary work for international agencies CSI Sports and TWI who relayed live Premier League, FA Cup, European and International football to a Worldwide audience.

He was a mainstay of their football coverage and commentated on the final day of the 1994–95 season as Blackburn Rovers clinched the title at Anfield against Liverpool and again in 1997-98 as Arsenal beat Everton at Highbury on the last day to become champions.

For 10 successive years Dempsey hosted the prestigious PFA Player of the Year Awards show from the Grosvenor House in London.

In 2002, he was a commentator for SBS covering the FIFA World Cup.

Although linked with rival networks on several occasions Dempsey remained with Sky until 2006 when he was offered the chance to return to Dublin to help launch Setanta Sports’ dedicated Irish sports channel. In 2007, he was nominated for an Irish Film and Television Academy Award for his hosting of the Rugby World Cup, an event which significantly enhanced the channel's reputation.

In 2009, Setanta's Great Britain operation went into administration. However, Dempsey continued to present and commentate on Irish TV on Premier League, FA Cup, Champions League, Europa League and International football.

The 2010 FIFA World Cup gave him the chance to continue his long association, on Australian TV with SBS, the main broadcaster of the sport in the pacific region. He had previously acted as both studio anchor and commentator stretching back to 1994, along with Martin Tyler. But in 2010 as Special Broadcasting Service developed their style and format, Dempsey was invited to host coverage from their Sydney HQ.

In September 2011, Dempsey became a presenter and commentator on subscription boxing channel BoxNation.

In 2012, Dempsey presented every game at Euro 2012 on Setanta, alongside pundits Dietmar Hamann, Gary McAllister, Dennis Wise, David O'Leary and Andy Cole. The coverage was carried into Singapore on StarHub and into Australia on Setanta Australia.

For the London Olympics Dempsey was invited to join the IOC's broadcasting arm, OBS, in their 10-channel, 3-language, 18-hour-per-day Live service, assisting former chief BBC sports producer John Shrewsbury in an editorial and production supervisor's role. Additionally he served as co-lead commentator, with John Helm, on the Men's and Women's Olympic Football tournaments.

During 2012-13 he was enlisted by ITV to help with their football coverage. For pay network Primetime he hosted the ill-fated ring return of Ricky Hatton in Manchester and, for ESPN, Wladimir Klitschko's world title defence, alongside co-host David Haye.

In 2013-14 Dempsey quickly became an established host on BT Sport for football and boxing while continuing to appear on Setanta Sports in Ireland, anchoring the Premier League highlights show and commentating on Champions League, Europa League and International football.  He was also recruited once more by the IOC TV arm to work on the Sochi Olympics in Russia.

At the start of 2015-16 he presented BT Sport's opening game, the Community Shield, Arsenal v Chelsea from Wembley with Glenn Hoddle, Rio Ferdinand and Ian Wright and on the opening weekend of the premier league campaign was commentator at Old Trafford for Manchester United v Tottenham Hotspur in the first ever Ultra High Definition broadcast of its kind.

Throughout the season he went on to commentate on Premier League, Champions League, Europa League and Bundesliga matches for BT Sport, culminating in the FA Cup Final at Wembley and the Europa League Final from Basel. He was also hired by UEFA for commentary duty on the Champions League Final in Milan.

As presenter of Boxing Tonight he fronted all BT Sport's boxing output, additionally acting as presenter for the return of David Haye at the O2 Arena which drew a record 3 million audience to UK TV and, for Channel 5, was anchor for the controversial Wembley Middleweight Title fight between Chris Eubank, jnr and Nick Blackwell. The summer of 2016 brought commitments at Euro 2016 and the Olympic Games in Rio.

In 2016/17 Dempsey continued as a commentator and presenter/reporter on BT Sport covering Champions League, Europa League and all Europe's top competitions with special emphasis on the Bundesliga. At the end of the season he was hired by FIFA affiliate HBS to provide commentary on the Confederations Cup in Russia, including the opening ceremony in St Petersburg. He was also confirmed as part of the commentary team for the 2018 FIFA World Cup.

In boxing, BT Sport began live broadcasting of the sport in April 2017 and Dempsey took up the role of anchor on Fight Night Live as he had during his long career on Sky Sports. He also served several other broadcasters including Channel 5.

In 2018 Dempsey continued to work mainly for BT Sport covering UEFA Champions League and Europa League plus the top leagues in England, Germany and Italy. At the 2018 FIFA World Cup he commentated from Russia on the worldwide broadcast.

In boxing he presented and commentated on big fights all over the world, including the Alvarez v Golovkin Middleweight Title fight in Las Vegas which was BT Sport's first ever pay per view event and, in December, the biggest fight of 2018, the WBC Heavyweight Title fight between Deontay Wilder and Tyson Fury in Los Angeles.

In addition to his broadcasting commitments at the Brazil World Cup in 2014 he co-headed the operations of Union Filmes, the Brazil-based production company in which he is a partner. Main clients included SBS, ITV and BBC. He is also a founding shareholder in sports design business, ShadowmanSports.

Personal life
Dempsey married wife Jill in 1996 and has two daughters born in 2000 and 2002.

References

External links
 

1960 births
Living people
Alumni of St John's College, Cambridge
Irish association football commentators
Irish sports broadcasters
Footballers from Marylebone
People from Marylebone 
League of Ireland players
People educated at City of Leicester Boys' Grammar School
University College Dublin A.F.C. players
Association footballers not categorized by position
Republic of Ireland association footballers
BT Sport presenters and reporters
Boxing commentators